"Waiting for the Sirens' Call" is a single released in 2005 by English band New Order. It was released by London Records on 26 September 2005, and was the third single from the album of the same title.

Release
Rather than the typical maxi CD and DVD configuration for the single, "Waiting for the Sirens' Call" was initially released as three separate 7" singles. Each 7" contained a different mix of the single as an A-side. On the B-side, each 7" contained a brand new remix of a classic New Order single. Many saw this as a bridging of the Waiting for the Sirens' Call album and the then-forthcoming Singles compilation. A CD single for "Waiting for the Sirens' Call" followed the three 7" singles, and was released on 3 October 2005. The two-track CD featured full-length remixes of the song.

The song was added to BBC Radio 2's A-List and was also playlisted by Xfm London. It debuted at #21 on the UK Singles Chart, one position lower than New Order's previous single, "Jetstream".

Cover
The cover image is a 1954 Eliot Elisofon photo of a nude woman in Tahiti, French Polynesia, seated in a river and placing a flower in her hair.
 
Cover artists: Howard Wakefield, Peter Saville, Eliot Elisofon
Design studio: Saville Associates

Track listings

 Includes exclusive mix by Martin Buttrich (Timo Maas' engineer) as well as exclusive full length cuts of two other mixes.

Chart positions

References

2005 singles
New Order (band) songs
Songs written by Phil Cunningham (rock musician)
Songs written by Bernard Sumner
Songs written by Peter Hook
Songs written by Stephen Morris (musician)
2005 songs